Szczęsne  is a village in the administrative district of Gmina Grodzisk Mazowiecki, within Grodzisk Mazowiecki County, Masovian Voivodeship, in east-central Poland.

References

Villages in Grodzisk Mazowiecki County